The swastika epidemic of 1959–1960 was a wave of anti-Jewish incidents which happened at the end of 1959 to 1960 all around the world. In West Germany only, 833 separate anti-Jewish acts were recorded between December 25, 1959 and mid-February 1960 by the authorities.

Cologne incident and its spread
The symbolic and widely publicized incident of vandalism against the Roonstrasse Synagogue in Cologne, Germany happened on the morning of Christmas 1959. It was perpetrated by Arnold Strunk and
Josef Schönen, members of far-right Deutsche Reichspartei.

On the night of December 30, a synagogue in Notting Hill, London was also defaced. Following that, other similar incidents occurred in Aximinster to York; five Jewish members of Parliament were threatened. In the United States, swastikas were painted, anti-Semitic slogans were displayed and Jewish property were attacked. Later, similar incidents spread to about 34 countries. In the U.S., the Anti-Defamation League of B'nai B'rith reported approximiately 637 discrete incidents in 236 cities, which ranges from the construction and display of swastikas (84%), mail, telephone or personal threats (11%) to physical damage (5%). 20 percent of the targets are public school, library and college buildings.

Response
Then German chancellor Konrad Adenauer called his cabinet to emergency meeting and passed a law against Volksverhetzung, or hate crimes against ethnic groups. In West Berlin, 40,000 people marched against anti-Semitism. Willy Brandt, then mayor of Berlin, Pinchas Rosen, the Israeli Minister of Justice and White House all expressed their concern and opposition.

In Britain, incidents targeting German employees and German products were reported.

Involvement of East Germany
At that time, a Communist conspiracy was suspected. Later, Strunk and Schonen were found to have traveled to East Germany twice in 1959 and had repeated contact with Russians on a military base. On January 16, Bernhard Schlottmann, the leader of a banned Neo-Nazi student league who had been arrested by German police, was revealed as having worked for East German state security for the past fourteen months. Meanwhile, British intelligence community released directives sent from Moscow to its agents, proving that Moscow was highly likely behind what had happened around the world.

References

External Links
 Desecration of the Cologne synagogue 55 years ago - a critical review
Antisemitism in Europe
Antisemitism in North America
Neo-Nazism in Europe
1959 in West Germany
History of antisemitism
20th century in Cologne
Crime in Cologne
False flag operations